The Philippines national netball team represents the Philippines in international netball competitions.

They made their international debut at the 2015 Southeast Asian Games.

History
Netball Singapore has offered aid to the Philippines to organize a netball team for the 2015 Southeast Asian Games set to be hosted by Singapore. After visits from Netball Singapore and the Netball Asia in 2014, Netball Philippines was formed and a national team was organized. Netball Singapore hosted a training camp in Singapore for the Philippine national team in December 2014. Players who have played in volleyball and basketball teams in the country were called up to form the first national team.

The Philippines entered the 2015 Southeast Asian Games in Singapore, their first tournament with modest expectations. They lost their first match against Thailand, with the scoreline of 22–62, in their opener on May 31, 2015. They also experienced a 112–11 defeat at the hands of the national team of Malaysia on June 1. Then they lost to Myanmar with the scoreline of 62–22.

The Philippine Sports Commission (PSC) allowed the national team to participate at the 2017 Southeast Asian Games in Kuala Lumpur, Malaysia despite the team's dismal performance in the previous edition. The handlers of the national team's sole reason given to the PSC was that they are still a "developmental team".

Players

Previous
Ten players were selected to participate at the 2015 Southeast Asian Games.

Coaching staff
Head coach:  Fransien Howarth
Assistant coaches: 
 Angelina Fedillaga
 Loo Yi Lin Jolynn

Competitive history

References

External links
Netball Philippines Official Website

National netball teams of Asia
Netball